Mohammad Yusef Mashriqi (born 7 July 1987) is an American-born Afghan professional soccer player.

Early life
Mashriqi's soccer lineage started with his father, Tahir, a former member of the Afghanistan national team. When communists took control of his country during the 10-year Afghanistan War, soccer took a back seat to survival for Tahir and his wife, Safora, and their son Sabir and daughter, Sabira, who were 5 and 3 at the time. Tahir took his family and fled to Pakistan. They reached the U.S. Embassy, and in 1985 they were safely in the United States. After settling in the Flushing, New York area, Mohammad was born two years later, in 1987.

Career

Youth and college
Mashriqi attended Flushing High School and from the age of nine played for the famed Blau Weiss Gottschee club in New York, winning four State Cup championships. He was a member of his regional ODP from 2001 to 2005, and played for the Brooklyn Knights in the USL Super-Y League, helping them reach the national semifinals. He played four years of college soccer at Long Island University

During his college years, Mashriqi also played in the USL Premier Development League for Bakersfield Brigade in 2006  and 2007, and with the Brooklyn Knights in 2009

Mashriqi trained with the Under-17 squad of prestigious club Paris Saint-Germain, and with the New York Red Bulls of Major League Soccer during their 2008 pre-season. Mashriqi is currently a part of the reserve squad for New York Red Bulls which plays in the MLS Reserve Division, while simultaneously playing for New York-area amateur team Brishna F.C.

International
Mashriqi was a member of the U.S. Under-14 National Team, but switched his international allegiance to his father's country, Afghanistan in 2010.

He played in both of Afghanistan's qualifying games for the 2014 FIFA World Cup against Palestine in July 2011, and scored his first international goal for Afghanistan in its 8–1 victory over Bhutan in the quarter finals of the 2011 SAFF Championship on December 7, 2011.

After being absent for almost 2 years Mashriqi was called up for the friendly match against Malaysia in October 2016.

Honours

Afghanistan
SAFF Championship: 2013

References

External links
Long Island University bio

bigapplesoccer.com
infosportinc.com
brishnafc.com

1987 births
Living people
American soccer players
Afghan expatriate footballers
Afghan footballers
Afghanistan international footballers
United States men's youth international soccer players
American people of Afghan descent
Association football midfielders
Expatriate footballers in India
Long Island University alumni
People from Flushing, Queens
Calcutta Football League players